Sathyavan is a 1994 Tamil language comedy film directed by Raj Kapoor. The film stars Murali and Gautami, with Goundamani, Senthil, R. Sundarrajan, Uday Prakash, Vennira Aadai Moorthy and Vadivukkarasi playing supporting roles. It was released on 9 September 1994. The film is a remake of the Telugu film April 1 Vidudala.

Plot

The film starts with the video photographer Diwakar arriving late to video-shoot a marriage, where he falls in love with Bhuvaneshwari at first sight. He then gets a hold of Bhuvaneshwari's maternal uncle Anjaneya and obtains information about Bhuvaneshwari. He gathers that she respects only the people who are self-employed and straightforward. He also finds out that she is unmarried and she is about to be transferred to his village. Back to his village, Diwakar has the plan to open a video shop with his friend Mani. In order to secure the capital, he uses all kinds of tricks to rip off the villagers. Diwakar blackmails Bhagyam to reveal her extramarital affair to her husband. He then gets money from Kiruba, a married man who is in love with Bhagyam and promises him to join them. He even claims money from chit fund which he never was a member of. After getting enough money, he opens his video shop. He starts to sell electronic products found on the street and advertises them as new products imported from Dubai.

Anjaneya writes him letters in Bhuvaneshwari's name making Diwakar assume that she is in love with him. Afterwards, Bhuvaneshwari, her mother and her bachelor uncle Anjaneya land in Diwakar's village, Diwakar arranges them a house. He learns that Bhuvaneshwari doesn't love him and he had been cheated by Anjaneya all along. Bhuvaneshwari puts forward a deal that she would marry Diwakar only if he stays out of cheating, and does not utter a lie in a month. What transpires next forms the rest of the story.

Cast

Murali as Diwakar
Gautami as Bhuvaneshwari
Goundamani as Kiruba
Senthil as Mani
R. Sundarrajan as Anjaneya
Uday Prakash as Gopi
Vennira Aadai Moorthy as Moorthy
Vadivukkarasi as Bhuvaneshwari's mother
Kavitha as Diwakar's mother
Rama Prabha as Moorthy's wife
Sharmili as Bhagyam
Vijaya Chandrika as Kiruba's wife
Mahima as Ammu
Typist Gopu as Mathrubootham
Kumarimuthu as Kuppasamy
Chelladurai as Ramamurthy
Boopathi Raja as Sundar
Kovai Senthil
Rajkumar
Chaplin Balu as Barber
Sethu Vinayagam as Thangaraj

Soundtrack

The film score and the soundtrack were composed by Ilaiyaraaja. The soundtrack, released in 1994, features 5 tracks with lyrics written by Vaali.

Reception

Malini Mannath of The New Indian Express gave a negative review, criticizing the slow screenplay and the performances of the actors.

References

External links

1994 films
1990s Tamil-language films
1994 romantic comedy films
Indian romantic comedy films
Films scored by Ilaiyaraaja
Tamil remakes of Telugu films
Films directed by Raj Kapoor (Tamil film director)